Jbel Lakhdar is a small mountain or hill in Morocco.

Geography
Its name means "the green mountain". Its summit is 687 meters high. During the French protectorate, there was a triangulation pillar marking that the height at the top was 893 m.

This mountain forms the natural border between regions of Doukkala to the west and Rahamna to the east.

Jbel Lakhdar may be considered as a low, distant foothill of the Atlas mountains in the direction of the Atlantic Ocean towards El Jadida.

Local traditions 
The neighbouring tribes of Oulad Ahmed, Oulad Jerrar and Rahamna used to climb to the summit for a minor pilgrimage on the Day of Arafa. Known as "pilgrimage of the poor", this custom ended in 2005.

Economy 
Pastures for cattle and sheep are used by neighboring rural communities and by shepherds from Rahamna. Limits for grazing are agreed by communities, but can be disputed in the years of drought. As its name suggested, Jbel Khedar is the last "green point" when rainfalls are scarce. Nearby villages are deserted by their inhabitants.

No touristic venture exists in the area, though there are mountain leisure opportunities and also historic centers to be seen in the area such as Dar Caïd Tounsi.

Climbing 
Climbing is rather easy, although there is no trail. It lasts one hour and a half. The summit line is horse-iron-shaped and one can follow it easily. Views on four sides are:
 Northerly: Plain of Rahamna to Soukhour Ar-rahmna
 Easterly: to the High Atlas and Djebilet (small mountains parallel to High Atlas)
 Southerly: to region of Youssoufia
 Westerly: Plain of Doukkala

References

External links

Lakhdar